Sean Yseult (born Shauna Reynolds; June 6, 1966) is an American rock musician who currently plays bass guitar in the band Star & Dagger. She has played various instruments with different bands since the mid-1980s, and is best known for playing bass in White Zombie.

Early life 
Her parents were both college English professors. Her mother, Ann Reynolds, taught the poetry of Geoffrey Chaucer, while her father, Michael South Reynolds, was an authority on the life of Ernest Hemingway. 

The atmosphere in the family home was bohemian, with artists and scholars gathering for deep conversation and socializing. Yseult's parents took her and her sister to many artistic events.

Before her days as a bassist, Yseult studied fine art and ballet while attending North Carolina School of the Arts for high school.

Music career

Early career / White Zombie
Yseult played bass in White Zombie for 11 years before they disbanded in 1998. In 1996, she participated along with Jay Yuenger in the tribute band to the Germs called Ruined Eye. After the breakup of White Zombie in September 1998, Yseult started playing bass for the band Rock City Morgue. She formed the Famous Monsters in 1995 which also featured Katie Lynn Campbell, bassist for the Toronto-based C'mon.

Post-White Zombie

In 2006 Yseult briefly played bass for and toured with The Cramps.

On November 1, 2010, Yseult released I'm in the Band, a book containing tour diaries and photos as well as detailing her eleven years spent as a member of White Zombie.

When Rock N Roll Experience Magazine asked Yseult in 2011 why she was not involved in the White Zombie box set her reply was, "It was a little bit of a fuck you to me & J. which was kinda weird since we were 2/3rd's of the band but anyways."

Personal life
Yseult moved to New Orleans in 1996, after White Zombie disbanded. She married Supagroup musician Chris Lee on January 12, 2008, in New Orleans, Louisiana, where she lives. With her husband, in 2002 she founded, then ran, a dive bar popular among artists and musicians, The Saint, in New Orleans's Garden District.

Yseult earned her degree in graphic design at Parsons The New School for Design in New York City. She also began showing her photography in galleries in 2002. In 2006, she began a design line featuring wallpaper, pillows, scarves with her hand drawn graphics. Gallery shows include exhibitions in New York City, Los Angeles, San Francisco, and New Orleans. Yseult has also been a member of The Rawk Show – Fine Art by Musicians, in Texas among other shows. In 2018, Yseult debuted a photography exhibit, entitled "They All Axed for You", at the Boyd Satellite Gallery in New Orleans.

References

External links

 
 Sean Yseult designs
 New York Times Vows Column, February 3, 2008
 RockBookShow interview about Sean's Book, "I'm in the Band"

1966 births
American heavy metal bass guitarists
Guitarists from North Carolina
Living people
White Zombie (band) members
The Cramps members
American fashion designers
Women bass guitarists
Musicians from New Orleans
Alternative metal bass guitarists
Guitarists from Louisiana
20th-century American women guitarists
20th-century American bass guitarists
American women fashion designers